Angerton was a railway station serving the village of Low Angerton in Northumberland, Northern England. It was located on the Wansbeck Railway, which diverged from the East Coast Main Line at Morpeth and joined the Border Counties Railway at Reedsmouth Junction.

History

Opened by the Blyth and Tyne (Wansbeck) Railway, which was taken over by the North British Railway, it became part of the London and North Eastern Railway during the Grouping of 1923. The station then passed to the Eastern Region of British Railways upon nationalisation in 1948 and was closed in 1952 by British Railways.

The site today 

The station house is now in private hands and has been extended, and the platform still exists. The trackbed of the old route can be followed West on foot, following the meandering River Wansbeck until it reaches a double arched stone bridge. A single solitary lineside telegraph pole can be seen along the route and the trackside fences have clearly been made using railway sleepers reclaimed once the line had shut.

References

Sources
 
 
 
 
 Station on navigable O.S. map
 

Disused railway stations in Northumberland
Former North British Railway stations
Railway stations in Great Britain opened in 1862
Railway stations in Great Britain closed in 1952
1862 establishments in England